Nicolaas Johannes Michel  (30 September 1912 - 24 June 1971) was a Dutch football goalkeeper who played for the Netherlands in the 1938 FIFA World Cup. He also played for Telstar.

References

External links
 FIFA profile

1912 births
1971 deaths
Dutch footballers
Netherlands international footballers
Association football goalkeepers
SC Telstar players
1938 FIFA World Cup players
People from Velsen
Footballers from North Holland